Mame Madior Boye (born 1940) is a former Prime Minister of Senegal from 2001 to 2002. She was the first woman to hold that position.

Background and career

Boye was born to a family of lawyers in Saint-Louis, and like her three brothers she was educated as a lawyer in Dakar and Paris. Her father was a clerk, then a bailiff. She graduated from Faidherbe High School in her hometown. In 1963, she enrolled at the Faculty of Legal and Economic Sciences at the University of Dakar and then continued her training at the National Center for Judicial Studies (CNEJ) in Paris until 1969.

She spent most of her career in the Senegalese administration of justice. She was successively Deputy Public Prosecutor, judge and first vice President of the Regional First Class Court of Dakar and chamber President of the Court of Appeal. She was a founder and the first woman president of the Association of Senegalese Lawyers from 1975 to 1990, then became the Director of Engagements for the West African Banking Company (Compagnie bancaire de l'Afrique Occidentale, CBAO) from September 1990 to April 2000. Boye was also vice president of the International Federation of Women Lawyers from 1978 to 1998. She was respected as a serious professional, intelligent and honest. She was a militant feminist, Muslim and divorced with two children. Her relations with the regime of President Abdou Diouf were strained and she did not accept high positions in the judicial system to preserve her integrity and independence.

Prime Minister

Following the victory of Abdoulaye Wade in the 2000 presidential election, Boye became Minister of Justice in April 2000. But tensions arose between the President and the Prime Minister, who was from another political party. Moustapha Niasse resigned and Boye was appointed by Wade as Prime Minister on 3 March 2001, two months before the legislative elections. Wade lacked a majority in the legislature and more than 30 non-partisan women's organizations organized a campaign before the elections demanding more women in the legislature. Boye was not only a woman, she was also non-partisan, which looked good. She remained as Minister of Justice in the new government. The elections gave Wade a large majority - 89 of 120 seats. The representation of women increased, but not to more than 19 per cent. Following the April 2001 legislative elections, Boye was reappointed as Prime Minister on 10 May 2001; she was, however, replaced as Minister of Justice in the government appointed on 12 May.

In Boye's second government there were five women of 25 ministers, against two previously. This was a nice victory for Boye. But the government faced considerable economic and social challenges. Efforts were made to strengthen education and health, improve salaries, reduce unemployment among the young and support the agriculture sector. But the ministers were new and inexperienced and views in the coalition differed. As Prime Minister Boye was subordinate to the President, and Wade was a hand-on, dynamic leader with clear authoritarian tendencies Boye and her government were dismissed by the President on 4 November 2002, reportedly due to her reaction to the MV Joola sea disaster in September 2002. It was one of the worst shipping disasters of all times. More than 1 800 people died when the state-owned ferry sank. Boye stated that the accident was due to the weather, thus excluding failures of ship and crew. But soon there were allegations of high-level errors. The head of the navy was dismissed and two ministers had to resign.

Afterwards

Later, in September 2004, Boye was appointed by Alpha Oumar Konaré as the African Union's Special Representative for the promotion of the protection of civilians in armed conflicts.

On 12 September 2008, a judge in France issued an arrest warrant for Boye, along with eight others, in connection with the Joola disaster. The Senegalese government rejected this and, in response, decided to prosecute the judge who issued the warrants. The Paris Court of Appeal annulled the arrest warrant for Boye in mid-June 2009.

References

1940 births
Female defence ministers
Living people
People from Saint-Louis, Senegal
Prime Ministers of Senegal
Senegalese Democratic Party politicians
Women prime ministers
Women government ministers of Senegal
Justice ministers of Senegal
Senegalese Muslims
Proponents of Islamic feminism
Heads of government who were later imprisoned
20th-century Senegalese women politicians
21st-century Senegalese women politicians
20th-century Senegalese politicians
21st-century Senegalese politicians